Muhammad ibn 'Abd Allah Al-Azraqi was a 9th-century Islamic commentator and historian, and author of the Kitab Akhbar Makka (Book of Reports about Mecca).

Al-Azraqi was from a family who lived in Mecca for hundreds of years. He gave information on the design and layout of the pre-Islamic Ka'aba at Mecca after its rebuilding following a fire in 603 AD until its possession by Mohammed in 630 AD.  The contents included a statue of Hubal, the principal male deity of Mecca, and a number of other pagan items, which were destroyed in 630 as idolatrous.  They also included a pair of ram’s horns said to have belonged to the ram sacrificed by the Prophet Abraham in place of his son, the Prophet Ismail, and a painting (probably a fresco) of Jesus and Mary.  According to Al-Azraqi, Mohammed spared these items, which survived until the destruction by the Umayyads in 683 AD.   Al-Azraqi is silent on the fate of the images of trees that are known also to have decorated the interior of the Ka'aba, pictures of which formed part of the mosaic decoration on the walls of the cathedral of al-Qalis in Sana'a, and were later to emerge in the Umayyad mosaics in the Dome of the Rock, the Mosque of the Prophet in Medina, and the Great Mosque of Damascus.

The key manuscript of Akhbar Makka is Leiden, University Library, Or.424. The only printed edition is volume one of Die Chroniken der Stadt Mekka, ed. by Ferdinand Wüstenfeld, 4 vols (Leipzig 1858-61), vol. 1, vol. 2, vol. 3, vol. 4.

References

9th-century Arabs
9th-century historians from the Abbasid Caliphate